Schetky Northwest Sales, Inc. is a company that sells both commercial and school buses and is located in Portland, Oregon.

The Schetky family first became involved with transportation in 1931 when Jack Schetky assembled what was rumored to be the first School Bus assembled west of the Mississippi River. In 1942, Jack Schetky and a business partner formed Roots & Schetky. One of their first jobs was the assembly of 65 buses with trailers to transport shipyard workers during World War II.  In 1945, Jack helped write the official School Bus Codes in the state of Washington.

In 1950, Jack Schetky and his son John purchased Root's half of the business and changed its name to Schetky Equipment.  In the ensuing years, John Schetky took a larger role in the business and helped write the official School Bus Codes for the states of Oregon (1950), and Alaska (1959).  John Schetky also lobbied for and helped launch a bill in the state of Oregon which simply read, "School districts shall have the authority to lease school buses." In 1975, John and son Randy changed the business' name once again to Schetky Northwest Sales and that is what it remains today. 

Official website: https://www.schetkynw.com/ 

Bus manufacturers of the United States
Companies based in Portland, Oregon
School bus manufacturers
Privately held companies based in Oregon